Goa may refer to:

Goan Konkani
Guwa language